Gleneagles may refer to:

Gleneagles (Scotland)
Gleneagles Hotel, Auchterarder, Scotland
Gleneagles Agreement, signed and held at the Gleneagles Hotel
The 31st G8 summit held in July 2005 at Gleneagles Hotel, Scotland
Gleneagles railway station, serving both Gleneagles and Auchterarder
Gleneagles Hotel, Torquay, England, the inspiration for Fawlty Towers
Gleneagles, a neighbourhood in West Vancouver, British Columbia, Canada
Gleneagles Elementary School in West Vancouver, British Columbia, Canada
The Gleneagles, a historic apartment building in Montreal, Quebec, Canada
Gleneagles (horse), a thoroughbred racehorse

See also 
 Gleneagle (disambiguation)
Gleneagles Hospital (disambiguation)